Tale about Boy-Kibalchish is a 1964 Soviet children’s war film directed by Yevgeny Sherstobitov and based on a story “A Tale about a War Secret, about the Boy Nipper-Pipper, and His Word of Honour” by Arkady Gaidar.

Plot 
The film tells about a boy nicknamed Kibalchish, a person of strong moral values, who fights against the corrupt, manipulative, egoistic, impudent rich men.

Cast 
 Sergei Ostapenko – Boy-Kibalchish
Sergei Tikhonov – Boy-Plokhish
Anatoly Yurchenko – Messenger
Sergey Martinson – Agent 518
 Leonid Gallis – Main Bourgeois
 Dmitry Kapka – Main General

References

External links 
 

1964 children's films
1964 films
1964 war films
1960s Russian-language films
Soviet war films
Films based on fairy tales